Boris Borisovich Piotrovsky (also written Piotrovskii;  – October 15, 1990) was a Soviet Russian academician, historian-orientalist and archaeologist who studied the ancient civilizations of Urartu, Scythia, and Nubia. He is best known as a key figure in the study of the Urartian civilization of the southern Caucasus. From 1964 until his death, Piotrovsky was also Director of the Hermitage Museum in Leningrad (now Saint Petersburg).

Biography
Piotrovsky was born in Saint Petersburg in 1908. He specialized in the history and archaeology of the Caucasus region and beginning in the 1930s, he began to acquaint himself with Urartian civilization. He was the head of 1939 excavations that uncovered the Urartian fortress of Teishebaini in Armenia (known in Armenian as Karmir Blur, or Red Hill). Evidence found there has been key in understanding the Urartian civilization. Piotrovsky lead further excavations in Armenia in the ancient settlements of Tsovinar, Redkig-lager, Kirovakan (now Vanadzor) and Aygevan until 1971.

These were not Piotrovsky's sole contributions in the archaeological field, however. Piotrovsky worked elsewhere in the Caucasus, especially on the Scythian culture. In 1961, he was placed at the head of an expedition of the USSR Academy of Sciences to study Nubian monuments in Egypt. He also spent 26 years as Director of the Hermitage Museum, which has been run by his son Mikhail thereafter. He was also the supervisor of the renowned Armenian archaeologist Gregory Areshian. The Hermitage holds an annual conference in his honor. He died of a cerebral hemorrhage in Leningrad in 1990 at the age of 82.

He was married to Hripsime Djanpoladjian, who was an archaeologist and epigrapher.

Works
In his lifetime, he published more than 200 works in the fields of archaeology, history and art. One of Piotrovsky's most important works is The History of Urartu and its Culture, published in 1944 and which went on to receive the USSR State Prize in 1946. Other notable works include:

Urartu: The Kingdom of Van and Its Art (1967)
The Ancient Civilization of Urartu (1969) 
The Hermitage: Its History and Collections (1982)

Honours and awards

Hero of Socialist Labor (1983)
Three Orders of Lenin
Order of the October Revolution
Three Orders of the Red Banner of Labour
Medal "For the Defence of Leningrad"
Medal "For Valiant Labour in the Great Patriotic War 1941-1945"
Medal "In Commemoration of the 250th Anniversary of Leningrad"
Jubilee Medal "Twenty Years of Victory in the Great Patriotic War 1941-1945"
Jubilee Medal "Thirty Years of Victory in the Great Patriotic War 1941-1945"
Jubilee Medal "Forty Years of Victory in the Great Patriotic War 1941-1945"
Commander of the Ordre des Arts et des Lettres (France)

References

External links
The Art and Culture of the Peoples of the Caucasus: 1100 B.C.–19th century (From the Hermitage website. One of the sections explains the importance of Teishbaini.)
Conference announcement for the conference in Piotrovsky's honor. Gives some biographical information.

1908 births
1990 deaths
Soviet historians
Russian orientalists
Soviet archaeologists
Full Members of the USSR Academy of Sciences
Writers from Saint Petersburg
Directors of the Hermitage Museum
Communist Party of the Soviet Union members
Armenian studies scholars
Commandeurs of the Ordre des Arts et des Lettres
Member of the Academy of the Kingdom of Morocco
Recipients of the Pour le Mérite (civil class)
Corresponding Fellows of the British Academy